{{Speciesbox
| name = Shovelnose guitarfish
| image = Shovelnose guitarfish.JPG
| image_caption = Dorsal view
| image2 = ShovelnoseGuitarfish01.JPG
| image2_caption = Ventral view
| status = NT
| status_system = IUCN3.1
| taxon = Rhinobatos productus
| authority = Ayres, 1854
| range_map = Rhinobatos_productus_range.png
| range_map_caption = Range of R. productus
| range_map_alt = World map with blue coloring along the coastal area of California reaching to Mazatlan
}}

The shovelnose guitarfish, Rhinobatos productus, is a ray in the family Rhinobatidae.
It becomes mature at an estimated seven to eight years old. Males are between 90 and 100 cm long, while females are around 99 cm at that age. The ray can live up to 11 years, and full-grown sizes are around 120 cm for males, and females reach 137 cm. They range from central California south to the Gulf of California.  Morphological and genetic variations occur in the mitochondrial DNA in those found in the Gulf of California, evidencing their isolation from the rest. Because of this, the conservation of this species must be carefully managed to preserve the biological diversity. The shovelnose is considered to be a primitively developed ray, with many features of both sharks and rays.Rhinobatos productus'' has magnetic particles in its vestibular receptors, and the magnetic particles believed to be exogenous in origin. The magnetic particles' spatial arrangement may aid in the sensitivity of the receptors to movements.

The visual system of the shovelnose is more extensive and developed than other Elasmobranchii, with multiple large projections connecting to the brain. Almost the entire dorsal and ventral hypothalamus is connected to the visual system, but still maintains a similar lack of differentiation as with sharks.

The shovelnose guitarfish was first considered to be a shark because of its dorsal fin's shape.

Human interaction

Recreation

This species can be caught from the surf, within shallow California waters. Sand crabs, various bivalves such as mussels, and other live or dead bait are recommended for catching the fish.

As food

The common cuts of meat used from the shovelnose guitarfish are the trunk, tail, and loin, mostly from mature individuals. It has been referred to as "shark steak" within markets, and is usually served fried; with other iterations such as cocktails and kebabs being prepared. It is sold as fish and chips in Santa Barbara, California on piers. Dried specimens of all sizes are also frequently sold in shell shops throughout central to Baja California.

Gallery

References

shovelnose guitarfish
Western North American coastal fauna
Fish of the Gulf of California
Fauna of the Baja California Peninsula
shovelnose guitarfish
Taxobox binomials not recognized by IUCN